Statistics of Empress's Cup in the 1986 season.

Overview
It was contested by 16 teams, and Shimizudaihachi SC won the championship.

Results

1st Round
Shimizudaihachi SC 5-0 Miyagi Hirose Club
Kumamoto Akita 2-1 Tendai FC
Chigasaki Kowada FC 0-2 Kusunoki SC
Toyama Ladies SC 0-4 Kobe FC
Nissan FC 9-0 Mikaho Reebons
Iga-Ueno Kunoichi SC 0-3 Takatsuki FC
Yomiuri SC Beleza 9-0 Yonago Cosmos
Ota Gal 1-2 Nishiyama Club

Quarterfinals
Shimizudaihachi SC 7-0 Kumamoto Akita
Kusunoki SC 0-4 Kobe FC
Nissan FC 1-2 Takatsuki FC
Yomiuri SC Beleza 3-0 Nishiyama Club

Semifinals
Shimizudaihachi SC 2-0 Kobe FC
Takatsuki FC 0-2 Yomiuri SC Beleza

Final
Shimizudaihachi SC 1-0 Yomiuri SC Beleza
Shimizudaihachi SC won the championship.

References

Empress's Cup
1986 in Japanese women's football